Mount Aragats is an isolated four-peaked volcano massif in Armenia. It is also one of the highest points in the Armenian Highlands.

The Aragats massif is surrounded by Kasagh River on the east, Akhurian River on the west, Ararat plain on the south and Shirak plain on the north.

Etymology and names
According to Armenian tradition, Aragats originates from the words Արա Ara + գահ gah, which translates to "Ara's throne". Ara refers to the legendary hero Ara the Beautiful. Aragats was mentioned by the early medieval historian Movses Khorenatsi, who in his History of Armenia claims that the mountain is named after Aramaneak, the son of Hayk, the legendary patriarch of the Armenian people. Aramaneak called his possessions "the foot of Aragats" (classical Armenian: ոտն Արագածոյ, otn Aragats'oy; modern: Aragatsotn). The modern Aragatsotn Province, dominated by the mountain, was formed in 1995. The name of the mountain is less often spelled Aragatz or Aragac.

A relatively modern name for the mountain is Alagöz, sometimes spelled Alagheuz, which literally means "variegated eye" in Turkish and Azerbaijani. This term was widely used up until the mid-20th century in European, Tsarist Russian, and early Soviet sources. Another version, Alagyaz (Ալագյազ), has been used in Armenian. A village on the foot of Aragats is named Alagyaz.

Geography and geology 

Aragats is isolated from Armenia's other mountain ranges. However, it is considered part and the highest point of the larger Lesser Caucasus mountain range. It has four summits, which are named according to their relative geographic position:
Northern—
Western—
Eastern—
Southern—
Mount Aragats has a topographic prominence of 2,143 meters, more than some higher mountains, such as Dykh-Tau (5,205 m high) in Russian part of Great Caucasus Range.

Numerous large lava flows descend from the volcano and are constrained in age between middle Pleistocene and 3,000 BCE. The volcanic system covers an area of 5,000 km2 and is one of the largest in the region. More recent activity in flank centres occurred in Tirinkatar (0.48-0.61 Ma), Kakavasar, (0.52-0.54 Ma) and Ashtarak (0.58 Ma), as well as Jrbazhan in the summit area (0.52 Ma). The magmas feeding Aragats are unusually hot for arc-derived magmas, resulting in long and voluminous lava flows.

Glaciation
Observations shortly after World War II showed the presence of firn fields and snowfields on the sides of the crater cirque as well as moraines and glaciers inside the crater. An analysis in 1896 indicated a surface area of 5.5-5.8 km2, but rapidly retreated afterwards. The glaciation has been retreating on account of insufficient snowfall and increasing temperatures. Glacial meltwater dominates the upper part of the rivers descending from Aragats but its importance decreases farther down the valleys. Traces of prehistorical glaciation also exist including thick moraines in the summit area at an altitude of 2,600-3,000 m.

Climate

History

Geological
The volcano was constructed within four different phases. The first phase (possibly 2.5Ma) occurred in the main crater and subsidiary vents and was basaltic andesite in composition. It crops out in deep gorges. The second phase (0.97–0.89 Ma, by K-Ar) involved the main vent, subsidiary structures and was basaltic and andesitic in composition with ignimbrites and pyroclastic, with tuffs and lava flows emanating from satellite centres. It was the most voluminous and included the Shamiram and Egvard subsidiary centres. The third phase (0.74–0.68 Ma) while similar to the second was more restricted in regional extent to the Mantash River basin. The fourth stage (0.56–0.45 Ma) involved mafic lava flows from parasitic vents in the southern parts of the volcano.

Cultural
Numerous engravings have been around the volcano, including rock paintings portraying animals and human-like figures in Kasagh River valley possibly of early Holocene age, and in Aghavnatun on the southern side of the volcano including petroglyphs showing animals that were possibly created in the 4th to 1st millennia BCE.

According to an ancient Armenian legend, Aragats and Mount Ararat were loving sisters who parted after a quarrel and separated permanently. Currently, the mountains are further separated politically, with Mt. Ararat being located in Turkey.

Another legend tells that Gregory the Illuminator, who converted Armenia into Christianity in the early 4th century, "used to pray on the peak of the mountain. At nighttime an icon-lamp shone to give light for him, the lamp hanging from heaven using no rope. Some say that the icon-lamp is still there, but only the worthy ones can see it."

In 1935, on the 15th anniversary of Armenia's Sovietization, around one thousand people climbed the summit of Aragats from five directions. On May 28, 2005—the anniversary of the establishment of the First Republic of Armenia—around 250,000 people participated in a Dance of Unity around Mount Aragats in a mass display of national unity. The quarter million participants, among them then-President Robert Kocharyan and Defense Minister Serzh Sargsyan, formed a  ring around the mountain after a blessing from Catholicos Karekin II. The organizers hoped the event would be included in the Guinness World Records. Prior to the dance, some 110,000 trees were planted on the slopes of Aragats.

Nearby settlements
The following settlements are located on the slopes or foot of Aragats: Ashtarak, Artik, Aparan, Talin, Oshakan, Byurakan.

Main sights

Historic and cultural sites

 
Aragats has historically played a significant role in Armenian history and culture. Numerous historical and modern monuments are located on its slopes, some of which are listed below.

The 4th century mausoleum of the Arsacid (Arshakuni) dynasty is located in the village of Aghtsk, on the slopes of Aragats.

One source calls Amberd the "biggest and the best preserved fortress" in modern-day Armenia.

The Alphabet Park (տառերի պուրակ, lit. "park of the letters") is located near the village of Artashavan. It was founded in 2005 on the 1600th anniversary of the invention of the Armenian alphabet. It features sculptures of the 39 letters of the Armenian alphabet and statues of notable Armenians, such as Mesrop Mashtots (the inventor of the alphabet), Armenia's national poet Hovhannes Tumanyan, Khachatur Abovian (father of modern Eastern Armenian literature), and others. A cross is added on an annual basis.

Scientific institutions

 
It was founded in 1943 by the brothers Artem Alikhanian and Abram Alikhanov.

It made Armenia one of the world's centers for the study of astrophysics in the 20th century.

The ROT-54/2.6, a radio telescope built in 1985 by the radiophysicist Paris Herouni in the village of Orgov, on the slopes of Aragats.

Gravity Hill
On the highway leading to fortress Amberd is a gravity hill, which has become a tourist attraction, due to an optical illusion leading to a downhill slope appearing to be uphill.

In culture

Mt. Aragats plays a special role in Armenian history and culture. Along with Ararat, it is considered a sacred mountain for the Armenians.

Aragats is a male first name in Armenia, used especially in areas surrounding the mountain.

Mt. Aragats is often associated with Gyumri, Armenia's second-largest city. The mountain is depicted on the coat of arms of Gyumri. It is also depicted on the obverse side of the 10,000 Armenian dram banknote (in use since 2003) in the background of Avetik Isahakyan, a poet born in Gyumri.
 
Numerous Armenians poets (e.g. Avetik Isahakyan) have written about Aragats. Marietta Shaginyan compared Aragats to a "half-open bud of a giant pomegranate flower". In one short poem, Silva Kaputikyan compares Armenia to an "ancient rock-carved fortress", the towers of which are Mount Aragats and Mount Ararat.
 
Numerous artists have painted Aragats. Some examples of paintings of Aragats are kept at the National Gallery of Armenia.

See also
 Lake Kari
 List of volcanoes in Armenia
 List of elevation extremes by country

Notes

References

Sources

Subduction volcanoes
Volcanoes of Armenia
Mountains of Armenia
Polygenetic volcanoes
Pliocene stratovolcanoes
Pleistocene stratovolcanoes
Holocene stratovolcanoes
Geography of Aragatsotn Province
Four-thousanders of the Caucasus
Four-thousanders of the Armenian Highland